The 1974 LPGA Tour was the 25th season since the LPGA Tour officially began in 1950. The season ran from February 1 to November 24. The season consisted of 32 official money events. JoAnne Carner and Sandra Haynie won the most tournaments, six each. Carner led the money list with earnings of $87,094.

The season saw the first tournament in Mexico, the Bing Crosby International Classic. There were three first-time winners in 1974: Bonnie Bryant, Gail Denenberg, and Sue Roberts. Bryant was the first, and through 2016 only, left-handed golfer to win on the LPGA Tour.

Kathy Whitworth won the LPGA's annual tour stop in St. Petersburg for a fifth time. Only three other golfers in tour history have won the same event five times.

The tournament results and award winners are listed below.

Tournament results
The following table shows all the official money events for the 1974 season. "Date" is the ending date of the tournament. The numbers in parentheses after the winners' names are the number of wins they had on the tour up to and including that event. Majors are shown in bold.

^ - weather-shortened tournament

Awards

References

External links
LPGA Tour official site
1974 season coverage at golfobserver.com

LPGA Tour seasons
LPGA Tour